KORK may refer to:

Media
 KORK-CD, a low-power television station (channel 35) licensed to Portland, Oregon, United States
 KSNV, a television station (channel 3 analog/2 digital) licensed to Las Vegas, Nevada, United States, which used the call sign KORK-TV prior to 1980
 KRLV (AM), a radio station licensed to Las Vegas, Nevada, United States, which used the call sign KORK prior to 1997
 KXPT, a radio station licensed to Las Vegas, Nevada, United States, which used the call sign KORK-FM prior to 1983

Music
 The Norwegian Radio Orchestra, called Kringkastingsorkestret in Norwegian, and commonly known by the acronym KORK

Places
 The ICAO airport code for North Little Rock Municipal Airport in North Little Rock, Arkansas, United States

See also
  Kork (disambiguation)